Croft is a hamlet in north Herefordshire, England. With the village of Yarpole it is part of Croft and Yarpole civil parish, the population of which at the 2011 census was 552.

Croft Castle was built in the 14th century and was the seat of the Croft family.

References

Hamlets in Herefordshire